UPMC Park, formerly known as Jerry Uht Park, is a baseball park located in Erie, Pennsylvania. It is the home of the Double-A Erie SeaWolves of the Eastern League, the city's Minor League Baseball (MiLB) franchise. The SeaWolves are affiliated with the Detroit Tigers Major League Baseball team. It hosted its first regular season game on June 20, 1995, in which major league veteran José Guillén hit a home run to ensure a SeaWolves victory over the Jamestown Jammers.

The park replaced Ainsworth Field, which was built in 1947, and features natural grass and dirt playing field. Its concessions include regional specialties such as pepperoni balls, ox roast sandwiches, cheesesteaks, and Yuengling beer. It is part of the Erie Civic Center Complex, which also includes Erie Insurance Arena and the Warner Theatre, all governed by the Erie County Convention Center Authority. The stadium has a seating capacity of 6,000. After the 2016 season, the SeaWolves partnered with the University of Pittsburgh Medical Center (UPMC) in a naming rights agreement to rebrand the stadium UPMC Park.

In a 2008, the ESPN sports broadcast company ranked the ballpark number five out of ten minor league ballpark seating arrangements. They especially noted its unique mezzanine level that overlooks the infield along the first base side. In July 2015, the People for the Ethical Treatment of Animals (PETA) also ranked the stadium number five among the most vegetarian-friendly minor league ballparks.

History

Prior to UPMC Park's construction, the Erie SeaWolves (then known as the Welland Pirates) played at Welland Stadium in Welland, Ontario. They moved to Erie after owner Marvin Goldklang relocated the Erie Sailors to Wappingers Falls, New York (where they became the Hudson Valley Renegades) because he did not want to upgrade Ainsworth Field to the standards Major League Baseball required of its affiliated clubs. Once the civic government secured an $8 million grant from the Commonwealth of Pennsylvania to build UPMC Park, the Welland Pirates moved to Erie. The remaining $1 million for architectural expenses were covered by the City of Erie, Erie County, and the 300-member Team Erie, each of whom contributed $300,000. Additionally, nearby Millcreek Township also contributed $25,000. The ballpark site was originally home to a Sears building turned Exhibit Hall. Groundbreaking ceremonies took place on July 27, 1994 and Jerry Uht Park was completed in May 1995.

On July 10, 2015, Jerry Uht Park hosted Global Force Wrestling's Grand Slam Tour, its first major professional wrestling event.

Original namesake

Gerard T. "Jerry" Uht, Sr. was a minor league baseball player and longtime Erie resident. In 1995, he established a $500,000 endowment with PNC Bank and the Erie Community Foundation to perpetually support the downtown baseball stadium. In response to his generosity, the city named Jerry Uht Park in his honor. As of January 2007, the Erie Community Foundation continues to manage the fund, valued at $750,000. The Erie Times-News indicated that the fund is designated for stadium maintenance expenses and equipment purchases. The name remained in use until a naming rights agreement with the University of Pittsburgh Medical Center (UPMC) after the 2016 season resulted in a name change to "UPMC Park."

Features

Seating along UPMC Park's first and third base lines has a unique configuration due to the space constraints of an urban construction. There are three main concession stands and a picnic area for fans, plus six luxury suites for special occasions. The ballpark is known for its two distinctive grandstands, each with its own design.

In 2006, the park was renovated at a cost of $4 million. Additions included a new  electronic scoreboard (which has a nautical theme featuring "Erie" spelled out with international maritime signal flags), a two-tiered picnic area, eleven luxury box seats, and new concession stands. An additional videoboard was added to Erie Insurance Arena, which borders the stadium, that displays scores from other Eastern League games, player statistics, and information about the Detroit Tigers. UPMC Park's batting zone resembles that of Comerica Park in Detroit, exaggerating the contour of the regulation home plate.

In spring 2012, a new  wall was constructed along the park's border with Erie Insurance Arena. The Erie Times-News dubbed it the "Gray Monster," an allusion to Fenway Park's Green Monster in Boston. Its construction was part of the $42 million renovation of Erie Insurance Arena, which lies a mere  from the left-field boundary.

On August 13, 2018, Pennsylvania Governor Tom Wolf announced UPMC Park would receive Redevelopment Capital Assistance Program funding totaling $12 million for upgrades to UPMC Park.  Enhancements are expected to include updated video boards, renovated suite, concession and restroom areas, and a new left field stadium entrance featuring a climate-controlled team store and stadium club.

Gallery

Concessions

Happy Howler, LLC, manages the concessions at UPMC Park, offering a typical ballpark menu of hot dogs, hamburgers, nachos, and peanuts. Some regional specialties include Erie-made pepperoni balls, ox roast sandwiches, and cheesesteaks. The most distinctive concession is the Smith's Sausage Shack, which grills German bratwurst, Italian sausage, Polish kiełbasa, and Cajun sausage along with the Pennsylvania-brewed Yuengling beer. Options for health-conscious, vegetarian, and vegan customers include veggie burgers and burrito bowls. Pepsi has exclusive pouring rights at UPMC Park for soft drinks.  In 2017, the Mojo & AC Rocket Dog, a Smith's hot dog topped with pulled pork, mac & cheese, bacon and BBQ sauce, was named the top food item in Minor League Baseball's BUSH's Home Run Recipes Contest.  The SeaWolves organization repeated as champions in 2018 with their Fiesta Burger, topped with pepper jack cheese, bacon, guacamole, onion strings and Bush's Black Beans.  Also during 2018, the facility offered a hot dog topped with Nerds candy in a cotton candy bun.  This outrageous item earned national recognition and notoriety for the SeaWolves organization.

References

External links

UPMC Park (Erie SeaWolves official website)
ESPN's Travel Ten: The Best of the Minor Leagues
 A View from My Seat
 Stadium Journey visit
 Ballpark Reviews visit
 Ballpark Guide visit 
 Ball Parks of the Minor Leagues visit
Rochester Area Ballparks visit

Erie, Pennsylvania
Sports venues in Pennsylvania
Baseball venues in Pennsylvania
Minor league baseball venues
College baseball venues in the United States
High school baseball venues in the United States
Sports in Erie, Pennsylvania
Buildings and structures in Erie, Pennsylvania
Erie SeaWolves
Tourist attractions in Erie, Pennsylvania
University of Pittsburgh Medical Center
Eastern League (1938–present) ballparks